Qalla Qhata (Quechua qalla carved stone, cobblestone; circular spindle disk; cheek, qhata slope, hillside, hispanicized spelling Jallacata) is a mountain in the Waytapallana mountain range in Peru, about   high. It is located in the Junín Region, Huancayo Province, Huancayo District, west of Waytapallana.

References

Mountains of Peru
Mountains of Junín Region